The Paleontological Site Arroio Cancela is located within the city of Santa Maria, a municipality of Rio Grande do Sul, the southernmost state of Brazil. The site is situated in the neighbourhood Nossa Senhora de Lourdes at an altitude of 107 metres above sea level. The fossils have been discovered within the sediments of the Santa Maria Formation, they are vertebrates from the Triassic period and are about 225 million years old.

This site is part of the Geopark Paleorrota and is easily accessible, because the Central Bus Station Station of Santa Maria is merely 600 metres away. Only one hundred metres from the site, at the corner of the streets Irmão Donato and Otavio Alves de Oliveira, is the school State General Edson de Figueiredo and a nearby shopping centre.

Thirty-five metres higher in elevation (and stratigraphy) one finds the Paleontological Site Largo Padre Daniel Cargnin and the Paleontological Site Bela Vista. At the Paleontological Site Largo Padre Daniel Cargnin (Point 1, Figure 2) Cargnin collected a Therioherpeton cargnini and at the Paleontological Site Bela Vista (Point 2, Figure 2) fragments of an unidentified skull were discovered. The last two sites are close to the Cerrito hill and belong already to the Caturrita Formation.

Area under study

The circled area comprises 9 hectares and is crossed by the stream (arroyo) Cancela starting at Osvaldo Aranha Street and flowing toward Fernando Ferrari Avenue. Along this stretch Triassic vertebrate fossils are found within the exposed red sediments. The main collection points are listed as 1, 2 and 3 in Figure 2. The distance from point 1 to point 3 is 185 meters, whereas the distance from point 3 to Otavio Alves de Oliveira Street is 142 meters.

Description of collection points:
 Here a baby saurischian dinosaur was discovered in 1974, yet the exact species could not be determined. The animal measured approximately 70 cm head to tail. About 70% of the trunk bones were preserved, and about 50% of the skull bones. The vertebrae were still articulated and the entire column was present. The animal's head was rather small in relation to the body, with a long and thin tail. The teeth were rounded, not pointed as in carnivores. The taxon therefore probably was a herbivore. (This fossil was lost).
 Here a Rhynchosaur was unearthed in 1975, it had lost its skull, but from the rest of the body approximately 30% of the bone material was preserved; its vertebrae were still articulated. (This fossil was also lost). Recently in 2005 a young Rhynchosaur was discovered in the same location, whose vertebrae were dismembered.
 Here four baby Exaeretodons were found in 2004, with most of the trunk bones and the vertebrae being dismembered, which means that the animals had undergone an advanced state of dismemberment before being completely covered by sediments. In 2002 a Rhynchosaur was discovered with approximately 60% of its torso preserved and the vertebrae still articulated. These fossils were donated to the UFRGS.

Concentration of fossils
Five digs, where they entered a fossil for each , so there should be fossils 50 per hectare, at this location.

This estimate were considered, only the exposed area, as if in two dimensions, regardless of the depth.

There is a height difference of more than 3 meters between point 1 and point 3. All this indicates that fossils were deposited at this location for a long time, and there may be more fossils below the stream.

Assuming that each meter of depth there are four layers of fossils, means that the estimated number of 490 can be multiplied by four to give the 1960 fossil every meter deep excavated. Thus, it is likely that there are between 500-2000 fossils in this study area. But this number may be higher since there are two other sites nearby and 30 meters above the site. This means that this area can extrapolate in breadth and depth.

See also
Paleorrota Geopark
Paleontology

Natural history of Brazil
Mesozoic paleontological sites of South America
Historical geology
Paleontological sites of Brazil
Triassic paleontological sites